Hassab Hospital or Hassab Clinic, established 1950, is the first private hospital in Alexandria, Egypt. It was founded by Dr. Mohammed Aboul-Fotouh Hassab and his brother Dr. Hussein-Kamel Hassab. 
The hospital was and is still popular for its orthopedic speciality, 
although it is a general hospital with various medical specialties.

References

 Google Maps

Hospital buildings completed in 1950
Hospitals in Egypt
Buildings and structures in Alexandria
Hospitals established in 1850
20th-century architecture in Egypt